The 47 mm APX anti-tank gun was a French anti-tank gun that saw service in the first years of the Second World War.

Development
In the 1930s the French Army sought a replacement for the derivatives of the 75 mm mle 1897 field gun it used as an anti-tank gun. The soixante-quinze was an effective anti-tank gun but was heavy and much harder to conceal than the newer, small, high-velocity, small calibre anti-tank weapons. A similar model designated the canon de 47 mm semi-automatique mle 1939 was also produced. Both were efficient weapons, especially given the thin armour of contemporary German tanks. Unfortunately for France, the 47mm SA mle 1937 and 47mm SA mle 1939 were still rare weapons at the time of the Battle of France.

Foreign use
Examples captured by the German forces were used under the name 4.7 cm Pak 181(f) for the mle 1937 and 4.7 cm Pak 183(f) for the mle 1939.  The guns were used in Atlantic Wall fortifications and armed a number of their  Panzerjäger self-propelled tank destroyers.

 4.7 cm Pak 181(f) oder 183(f) auf PzJäg Lorraine Schlepper (f) - mounted on a French Lorraine 37L tracked artillery tractor chassis
 4.7 cm Pak(f) auf Panzerspähwagen P204(f) - mounted on a French Panhard 178 armored car chassis
 4.7 cm Pak(f) auf PzKpfW I - mounted on a Panzer I chassis
 4.7 cm Pak(f) auf PzKpfW Mk.II 748(e) - mounted on a British Matilda II tank chassis
 4.7 cm Pak 181(f) oder 183(f) auf PzKpfW 35R(f) - mounted on a captured French Renault R35 infantry tank chassis

Variants
 47mm SA mle 1939 TAZ - a variant on a tripod, capable of 360° traverse, which did not enter production.
 47mm SA 35 mle 1935 - an earlier variant, mounted on tanks such as the Somua S35 and the Char B1, used shortened 47×193 mm R cartridge.

See also
 25 mm Hotchkiss anti-tank gun
 47 mm Model 1931 anti-tank gun - a comparable Belgian gun of the same period
 4,7cm KPÚV vz. 38 - a comparable Czech gun

References

 Ferrard, Stéphane. France 1940 l'armement terrestre, ETAI, 1998, 

World War II weapons of France
World War II anti-tank guns
47 mm artillery
Military equipment introduced in the 1930s